WheelGroup was a computer security company with approximately 65 employees based in San Antonio, Texas. The 10 founders originally met and worked together at the US Air Force Information Warfare Center and they started Wheelgroup in November 1995. WheelGroup was one of the first companies to specialize in network security and penetration testing.

The company developed and sold the first commercial intrusion detection system, NetRanger, which was the flagship intrusion detection software at Cisco Systems and which has now been re-engineered, and re-branded, as the Cisco Systems Adaptive Security Appliance.

WheelGroup also created the first Python based network vulnerability scanner, NetSonar, which was later re-branded and sold as the Cisco Network Security Scanner.  WheelGroup was acquired by Cisco Systems for $124 million on March 12, 1998.  Since the acquisition of WheelGroup, the original founders have all moved on to positions at other computer security companies, or started their own computer security companies. Kevin Ziese passed in February, 2017

Defunct software companies of the United States
Cisco Systems acquisitions